Avneesh Sudha (born 20 November 2001) is an Indian cricketer. He made his first-class debut for Uttarakhand in the 2018–19 Ranji Trophy on 15 January 2019. He made his List A debut on 27 September 2019, for Uttarakhand in the 2019–20 Vijay Hazare Trophy. He made his Twenty20 debut on 8 November 2019, for Uttarakhand in the 2019–20 Syed Mushtaq Ali Trophy.

References

External links
 

2001 births
Living people
Indian cricketers
Uttarakhand cricketers
Place of birth missing (living people)